Fabio Fabiani (born 13 October 1974 in Ravenna) is an Italian auto racing driver.

Moto Bike Career

He started in Italian Sport Production Championship in 1994 moving to Italian 125cc in 1995. After Military Service in 1996 he raced in the Italian 600 Sport Production class, Italian 125cc, European 125cc and 250cc. In 2004 he has a serious road car accident and was in a coma for 12 days. After a long convalescence period, he returned to bikes and had a major accident riding. He retired from bikes after that.

Car Racing Career

Having previously raced in motorcycling at national and international level, Fabiani began racing cars in 2005. He competed in the European Touring Car Cup in 2007 and 2008, winning the Super Production class in 2008  and was second in 2010 and 2011. He made his World Touring Car Championship debut for Proteam Motorsport at the 2009 FIA WTCC Race of Italy and won the WTCC Jay-Ten Trophy in 2011.
In 2014 he returned to racing with PAI Tecnosport (Italy), competing in the "Coppa Italia" with Eugenio Pisani in a Seat Leon Supercopa Long Run.

Racing record

Complete WTCC results
(key) (Races in bold indicate pole position) (Races in italics indicate fastest lap)

References

External links
 

1974 births
Living people
Sportspeople from Ravenna
Italian motorcycle racers
Italian racing drivers
World Touring Car Championship drivers
European Touring Car Cup drivers

Engstler Motorsport drivers
TCR Europe Touring Car Series drivers